Kettlethorpe High School (KHS) is a mixed secondary school with specialist status for maths and computing in Wakefield, West Yorkshire, England. It provides for children ages 11–16, with a comprehensive admissions policy, and in January 2022 had an enrolment of 1,619 pupils.

Qur'an controversy
In February 2023, the school suspended four Year 10 pupils for causing minor damage to the pages of a personal copy of the Qur'an by dropping it accidentally. While there were rumours of deliberate damage, a school investigation finding there was no "malicious intent". The Free Speech Union wrote a letter demanding that West Yorkshire Police expunge the hate incident record against the four boys. The mother of one autistic boy said that he had stopped eating due to death threats, and Home Secretary Suella Braverman expressed concern at the police involvement in the matter. Humanists UK alleged that the school took severe disciplinary action because of religious pressure.

Notable people
 Philippa Thomas, British television journalist, is an ex-pupil of the school. 
 Stuart Lancaster, England International Rugby Coach, was a PE teacher at the school.
 Claire Cooper, actress, starred in Hollyoaks.
 Chris Chester, ex-rugby league player for Halifax, Wigan Warriors, Hull F.C. and coach of Hull Kingston Rovers and Wakefield Trinity.
 Amy Garcia, BBC Look North newsreader.

References

External links 

 

Schools in Wakefield
Secondary schools in the City of Wakefield
Community schools in the City of Wakefield

Specialist maths and computing colleges in England